Target language may refer to:

Target language (computing), the computer language a language processor translates into
Target language, the language being learnt in language education
Target language (translation), the language a source is translated into

See also
Source language (disambiguation)